Gary Evans (born 22 February 1969) is an English professional golfer.

Evans was born in Rustington, West Sussex. As an amateur, he won the Brabazon Trophy in 1990 and 1991 (shared both times), and represented Great Britain & Ireland in the 1991 Walker Cup. He turned professional later that year.

Evans earned membership of the European Tour on his first visit to the qualifying school. He was a consistent performer on the European Tour throughout his career, finishing inside the top 100 on the Order Of Merit every season he played from 1992 through 2004 (he missed the 1995 season with a wrist injury), with a best of 21st place in 2002. Back and shoulder problems which eventually required surgery brought a premature end to his 2005 season, and he retired at the end of 2006 having never won a tournament on the European Tour.

The highlight of Evans' career came at the 2002 Open Championship at Muirfield where he was in contention on the final day and finished in a tie for fifth place, just one stroke outside the four man play-off, eventually won by Ernie Els.

Two years later, at the 2004 Open, Evans became only the seventh golfer in the long history of the competition to record an albatross (double eagle), on the fourth hole at Royal Troon.

Amateur wins
1986 Carris Trophy 
1990 Brabazon Trophy (tied with Olivier Edmond), Lytham Trophy
1991 Brabazon Trophy (tied with Mark Pullan), Lytham Trophy

Results in major championships

Note: Evans only played in The Open Championship and the PGA Championship.

CUT = missed the half-way cut
"T" indicates a tie for a place

Results in World Golf Championships

"T" = Tied

Team appearances
Amateur
Sussex Schools and English Schools: 1985
Sussex Boys, Youths, Seniors: 1985-1991
England Boys, Youths, Seniors: 1985-1991
Eisenhower Trophy (representing Great Britain & Ireland): 1990
European Amateur Team Championship (representing England): 1991 (winners), 1993
Walker Cup (representing Great Britain & Ireland): 1991

References

External links

English male golfers
European Tour golfers
People from Rustington
1969 births
Living people